Alison L. Young is a British legal scholar, specialising in public law and constitutional theory. Since January 2018, she has been Sir David Williams Professor of Public Law at the University of Cambridge and a Fellow of Robinson College, Cambridge. She was previously a tutor in law and Fellow of Balliol College, Oxford (1997–2000) and of Hertford College, Oxford (2000–2017), and a lecturer then Professor of Public Law in the Faculty of Law, University of Oxford.

Young grew up on a council estate. She studied law and French at the University of Birmingham, graduating with a Bachelor of Laws (LLB) degree. She then matriculated into Hertford College, Oxford to undertake postgraduate studies in law, and graduated from the University of Oxford with Bachelor of Civil Law (BCL) and Doctor of Philosophy (DPhil) degrees.

She was a runner up for the Inner Temple Book Prize 2018 for her monograph Democratic Dialogue and the Constitution (2017).

Selected works

References

Living people
Year of birth missing (living people)
British legal scholars
Women legal scholars
Scholars of constitutional law
Fellows of Robinson College, Cambridge
Fellows of Balliol College, Oxford
Fellows of Hertford College, Oxford
Legal scholars of the University of Cambridge
Legal scholars of the University of Oxford
Alumni of the University of Birmingham
Alumni of Hertford College, Oxford
Professors of the University of Cambridge